Kevin Hench is an American screenwriter, television producer, television writer and columnist for Foxsports.com.

Hench is a frequent collaborator with comedian Adam Carolla, having co-written and co-produced the 2007 film The Hammer and two network TV pilots starring Carolla. Hench was also a producer on Carolla's series The Man Show and Too Late with Adam Carolla. With retired NBA player John Salley, Hench hosted a podcast called Spider and the Henchman for Carolla's ACE Broadcasting Network.

Hench appears regularly on the NPR sports show Only A Game. He has also appeared on the ESPN show Jim Rome Is Burning.

Hench is an alumnus of the University of Vermont. He resides in Los Angeles with his wife, actress Heather Juergensen.

References

External links
 Kevin Hench - FOX Sports on MSN
 

American male screenwriters
American sportswriters
American television producers
American television writers
Living people
University of Vermont alumni
Place of birth missing (living people)
Year of birth missing (living people)
American male television writers
American male non-fiction writers